Mova, or mova may refer to:

 Mova (camera system), a multi-camera high resolution facial capture system
 mova, the defunct PDC service of the Japanese cellular operator NTT DoCoMo

See also
 Ukrainian language
 Belarusian language
 Ruthenian language